The National Medical Journal of India is a bimonthly peer-reviewed medical journal that was established in 1988. It is published by the All India Institute of Medical Sciences, New Delhi. It is abstracted and  indexed in Index Medicus (Medline), Current Contents/Clinical Medicine, Excerpta Medica, BIOSIS Previews, and the Science Citation Index. According to the Journal Citation Reports, the journal has a 2011 impact factor of 0.595.

Article types include Editorials, Original Articles, Review Articles, Selected Summaries, Letters from Chennai, Mumbai, London, and Glasgow, Clinical Case Reports, Book Reviews, Clinico-pathological Conferences, Everyday Practice, Masala, and News from Here and There.

The founding editor-in-chief was Samiran Nundy (1988–1996). Later editors have been K.S. Reddy (1997–2003) and Peush Sahni (2004–present).

References

External links 
 

General medical journals
Bimonthly journals
Publications established in 1988
English-language journals
Academic journals published in India
Academic journals associated with universities and colleges